Prosostoma is an extinct genus of sea urchins belonging to the family Asterostomatidae.

These slow-moving shallow infaunal deposit feeder-detritivores lived during the Eocene of Cuba, from 55.8 to 33.9 Ma.

Species 
 Prosostoma jimenoi Cotteau 1870

References

External links 
 Natural History Museum

Spatangoida
Eocene animals of North America
Fossils of Cuba
Fossil taxa described in 1883